is a Japanese actress and fashion model managed by Jiotto Model Management.She is well known for her role as Sela/Zyuoh Shark in the 40th entry of the Super Sentai series, Doubutsu Sentai Zyuohger

Biography and career
Miki Yanagi was born in Osaka Prefecture on August 24, 1997.

In 2016, Yanagi debuted as an actress, with her first leading role in the 2016 Super Sentai series Doubutsu Sentai Zyuohger as Sela.

Filmography

TV series

Film

Video game

Others

References

External links
 Official blog
 Official agency profile 

Japanese female models
21st-century Japanese actresses
1997 births
Living people
People from Osaka Prefecture